Planá (also known as Planá u Mariánských Lázní;) is a town in Tachov District in the Plzeň Region of the Czech Republic. It has about 5,300 inhabitants. The town centre is well preserved and is protected by law as an urban monument zone.

Administrative parts
Villages of Křínov, Kříženec, Otín, Pavlovice, Svahy, Týnec, Vížka, Vysoké Sedliště and Zliv are administrative parts of Planá.

Geography
It lies on the border between the Teplá Highlands and Upper Palatine Forest Foothills. There are several ponds in the territory, the largest are Anenský and Labutí.

History

The first written mention of Planá is from 1251. Planá was located on an important trade route from Nuremberg to Cheb. The oldest part of Planá was built during the 13th and 14th century and at the end of the 14th century it was quite a large town, surrounded by walls and a moat.

The Planá estate was owned by several aristocratic families, including Lords of Dobrohošť, Žeberka family, Schlick family, Sinzerdorf family, Nostitz family and Nostitz-Rhieneck family. The most significant owners were the Schlick family. During their reign, mining flourished and the mint was moved to Planá after it ceased to exist in Jáchymov.

Demographics

Sights

The Svobody Square is in the town's historical core. The town hall was built in 1680–1685. The Baroque plague column with the statue of Saint John of Nepomuk on its top is from 1712. Most of the houses on the square are in Gothic or Renaissance style and are protected as cultural monuments.

The oldest town's monument is the Church of Saints Peter and Paul from the 13th century. It is the nationwide important monument with unique frescoes and a rare Romanesque portal with an arched frieze.

Church of the Assumption of the Virgin Mary is the largest church in Planá. It was built in the 13th–14th century, originally in the late Romanesque style.

The Mining Museum is located in the Ondřej Schlick adit, which was excavated in the 16th century. It documents mining of silver ore in Planá and its surroundings, and existence of mint for minting silver coins, owned the Schlick family.

The castle was continuously built and rebuilt from the 13th to the 20th century and therefore contains building elements from Gothic to the present. Between 1948 and 1991 it served as barracks of the border guard and since then it is abandoned and is crumbling. Its English garden is open to the public.

Notable people
Siegfried Becher (1806–1873), Austrian political economist
Hans Tropsch (1889–1935), chemist
Fritz Wittmann (1933–2018), German politician
Petr Pavel (born 1961), army general and president of the Czech Republic
Zdeněk Štybar (born 1985), cyclo-cross racer
David Vaněček (born 1991), footballer
Dominik Kahun (born 1995), German ice-hockey player

Twin towns – sister cities

Planá is twinned with:
 Tirschenreuth, Germany

References

External links

Populated places in Tachov District
Cities and towns in the Czech Republic